Miss International 2007, the 47th Miss International pageant, was held on October 15, 2007 at The Prince Park Tower in Tokyo, Japan. 61 contestants from all over the world competed for the crown. Miss International 2006, Daniela Di Giacomo of Venezuela, crowned her successor Priscila Perales of Mexico as the new Miss International.

Results

Placements

Special awards

Contestants

  – Paula Quiroga
  – Rita Tsatryan
  – Jonella Oduber
  – Danielle Byrnes
  – Yuliya Sindzeyeva
  – Angélica Olavarría
  – Carolina Prates
  – Justine Stewart
  – Marie Ann Salas
  – Lina Ding
  – Ana Milena Lamus
  – Leonela Paniagua
  – Veronika Pompeova
  – Ana Carolina Viñas Machado
  – Jessica Ortiz
  – Madonna Khaled
  – Ledin Damas
  – Kidan Tesfahun
  – Joanna Väre
  – Sophie Vouzelaud
  – Svetlana Tsys
  – Despoina Vlepaki
  – Ann Love Viranin
  – Alida Maria Boer Reyes
  – Margarita Valle
  – Grace Wong
  – Esha Gupta
  – Rahma Landy Sjahruddin
  – Hisako Shirata
  – Park Ga-won
  – Laura Fogele
  – Grace Bejjani
  – Harriette Thomas
  – Yim Lim Nee
  – Priscila Perales
  – Gerelchuluun Baatarchuluun
  – Kyla Hei Hei
  – Sokari Akanibo
  – Stephanie Araúz
  – Daiana Ferreira
  – Luisa Fernanda Monteverde
  – Nadia Lee Cien Dela Cruz Shami
  – Dorota Gawron
  – Haydil Rivera
  – Jolette Sven Wamba Miylou
  – Alexandra Mazur
  – Teodora Marcic
  – Christabelle Tsai
  – Kristína Valušková
  – Nerea Arce
  – Aruni Madusha Rajapakse
  – Chantyn Ramdas
  – Tzu-Wei Hung
  – Jamilla Munisi
  – Chompoonek Badinworawat
  – Asli Temel
  – Mariya Varyvoda
  – Samantha Freedman
  – April Strong
  – Vanessa Peretti
  – Phạm Thị Thùy Dương

Notes

Replacements

  – Alice Panikian (Top 10 Universe '06)
  – Hania Hernandez
  – Yasmina Roman
  – Prapaphan Phongsitthong
  – Galena Andreyeva

Withdrawals
 – Jennifer Maduro

Did not compete

  – Melissa Key
  – Marthe Nathalie Houag
  – Dilys Zahabi
  – Karoline Kleven
  – Yar Ong’a
  – Karishma Patel

References

External links
 Pageantopolis – Miss International 2007

2007
2007 in Tokyo
2007 beauty pageants
Beauty pageants in Japan